The Communauté de communes du Sud Arrageois was located in the Pas-de-Calais département, in northern France. It was created in January 1993. It was merged into the new Communauté de communes du Sud-Artois in January 2013.

Composition
It comprised the following 22 communes:

Ayette  
Boiry-Becquerelle  
Boisleux-au-Mont  
Boisleux-Saint-Marc 
Boyelles 
Bullecourt 
Chérisy  
Courcelles-le-Comte  
Croisilles  
Écoust-Saint-Mein  
Ervillers 
Fontaine-lès-Croisilles  
Gomiécourt  
Guémappe  
Hamelincourt  
Hénin-sur-Cojeul  
Héninel 
Mory 
Moyenneville  
Noreuil 
Saint-Léger 
Saint-Martin-sur-Cojeul

References 

Sud Arrageois